Firozpur City railway station is located in Firozpur district in the Indian state of Punjab and serves Firozpur.

The railway station
The station serves Firozpur-Fazilka line.

References

External links
 Trains at Firozpur City

Railway stations in Firozpur district
Firozpur railway division
Transport in Firozpur